The 2017 FC Aktobe season is the 23rd successive season that the club playing in the Kazakhstan Premier League, the highest tier of association football in Kazakhstan. Aktobe will also participate in the Kazakhstan Cup.

Season events
Prior to the start of the season, Ihor Rakhayev replaced Yuri Utkulbayev as the club's manager.

Aktobe's home games against Atyrau on 16 April, and Shakhter Karagandy on 22 April where postponed as the pitch at their stadium was not ready after an extended period of winter weather.

On 13 May, Ihor Rakhayev was sacked as manager, with Igorya Prohnitskogo taking temporary charge. On 24 May, Vladimir Mukhanov was announced as the club's new manager.

Squad

Transfers

Winter

In:

Out:

Trial:

Summer

In:

Out:

Friendlies

Competitions

Kazakhstan Premier League

Results summary

Results by round

Results

League table

Kazakhstan Cup

Squad statistics

Appearances and goals

|-
|colspan="14"|Players away from Aktobe on loan:
|-
|colspan="14"|Players who left Aktobe during the season:

|}

Goal scorers

Disciplinary record

References

External links
 

FC Aktobe seasons
Aktobe